My Fair Nanny may refer to:

 "My Fair Nanny", a 1993 episode of American sitcom The Nanny
 My Fair Nanny (TV series), a Russian sitcom based on the American series